WKSN (1340 AM) – branded Kissin' Oldies 1340 – is a commercial oldies radio station licensed to Jamestown, New York. Owned by Media One Radio Group, the station serves as a local affiliate for the Cleveland Guardians Radio Network.

History 
AM 1340 signed on in 1948 as WJOC. It used the call sign WXYJ in the mid-1960s before adopting the WKSN call sign and "Kissin'" slogan by no later than 1968. For most of its early history, WKSN played a Top 40 format using the "Good Guys" slogan. A television sister station, WNYP (channel 26), signed on in 1966, when both stations were owned by Bud Paxson; channel 26 shut down after three years and its license is now being used by a religious station. During the 1990s and early 2000s, WKSN (Kissin' Oldies) was an oldies outlet carrying a local morning show and a midday show by Paul Hoefler (now performing commercial jingles in the area), as well the satellite Good Time Oldies from Jones Radio Networks until the station was bought out by Media One Group, LLC in 2003.

Soon after Media One's purchase, WKSN began being used as a counterprogramming station to the other AM radio station in Jamestown, WJTN, also owned by Media One Group. From approximately 2004 until the summer of 2008, the station ran  with shows such as Rush Limbaugh (counterprogrammed to a liberal program known as The Hall Closet on WJTN), Imus in the Morning, Bill Bennett, Dr. Dean Edell and Glenn Beck, as well as affiliations with Talk Radio Network and FOX Sports Radio. On July 4, 2008, WKSN switched back to the oldies format.  With the change to oldies (and The Hall Closet'''s discontinuation), Edell, Beck and Ed Schultz were moved to sister station WJTN (Schultz actually began airing on WJTN on June 23, 2008 in Ray Hall's time slot, so both WJTN and WKSN were airing Schultz from June 23 to July 3, 2008), while Rush Limbaugh was dropped from the market altogether (after a brief stint on rival station WLKW-FM, the show has again been absent from the southwestern New York airwaves). Not long afterward, WJTN also changed to a music format, extending its adult standards/MOR format (at the time only played on Jim Roselle's show) throughout the day.

WKSN was an affiliate of Scott Shannon's The True Oldies Channel until that station ceased terrestrial distribution in June 2014. WKSN was an affiliate of NFL on Westwood One then moved to sister station WJTN; for many years, it was the radio home of the Jamestown Jammers (Jammers broadcasts were dropped from WKSN several years before the team left Jamestown).

WKSN began streaming its programming on the Internet in November 2019.

In September 2022, the Erie Otters announced a radio broadcast partnership with WKSN beginning in the 2022-2023 OHL season.

Programming
Since 2014, WKSN has had no disc jockeys and has run a primarily automated oldies library based primarily in the 1960s and 1970s. Intelligence for Your Life with John Tesh is heard during morning drive time, with weather provided by the meteorologists at WGRZ in Buffalo. The syndicated Cool Bobby B's Doo-Wop Stop'' airs on weekends; additional syndicated programs were added to the weekend lineup in 2022.

References

External links

 FCC History Cards For WKSN (AM) (1947-1980)

Jamestown, New York
KSN
Oldies radio stations in the United States